Lesley Phuti Manyathela (4 September 1981 – 9 August 2003) was a South African professional soccer player who played as a striker for Premier Soccer League club Orlando Pirates and the South African national team.

A prolific goalscorer, Manyathela scored 48 goals in 73 appearances for Orlando Pirates and was the league's top goalscorer in 2003. Later that year, he was involved in a car accident which resulted in his death, aged 21. Following his death, the PSL award for the top goalscorer was renamed the Lesley Manyathela Golden Boot in his honour and the national team temporarily retired the number 19 jersey which he had previously worn.

Club career
Having represented Chelamoya and Dynamos at youth level, Manyathela joined Orlando Pirates with whom he made his senior debut in September 2000, at the age of 19. During the 2001–02 PSL season, he ended the campaign as the league's second top goalscorer behind Ishmael Maluleke. The following season, he claimed the Golden Boot award, becoming the second and, to date, most recent Pirates player to win the award, and helped the club to its second league title in three seasons. His domestic form caught the attention of a host of European clubs and at the end of the season he underwent trials with Ligue 1 side Lyon and Greek side OFI Crete. On 9 August 2003, he scored a consolation goal in a 2–1 Supa 8 loss to Jomo Cosmos. The goal proved to be his last, though, as following the match, he died. He ultimately made 73 appearances for the club and scored 48 goals.

International
Manyathela represented South Africa at under-20 level, where he scored once in five appearances, and at under-23 level where he scored six goals in 13 appearances.

He made his senior debut for South Africa against Saudi Arabia on 20 March 2002. Seven days later, he received his first and only red card when he was sent off in a 4–1 friendly loss to Georgia. His first goal came in a friendly against Madagascar in March 2003 which he followed up with a brace in a 3–1 win over Trinidad & Tobago in June. After his death later that year, the South African Football Association temporarily retired the number 19 jersey which he had worn during his time with the national team. He had scored 3 goals in 9 international appearances by the time of his demise.

Death & legacy
On 9 August 2003, following a match against Jomo Cosmos, Manyathela was killed in an accident after his car overturned on the N1 highway near his hometown of Musina. It was reported that the airbags in the Volkswagen Golf Mk4 that he was driving did not deploy as a result of him not wearing his safety belt. He was driving with a friend at the time of the accident, who suffered only minor injuries, and was en route to visit his mother for Women's Day celebrations.

His death was considered a national tragedy and drew comment from South African President Thabo Mbeki who offered his condolences to the family, friends and teammates of Manyathela. He was laid to rest on 16 August 2003 with Orlando Pirates chairman Irvin Khoza and Mamelodi Sundowns owner Patrice Motsepe among those acting as pallbearers. His tombstone was unveiled the following month, on the day of South Africa's national Heritage Day.

Ahead of the 2003–04 Premier Soccer League season, the award for the top goalscorer in a season was renamed the Lesley Manyathela Golden Boot and the Musina municipality also named the local football stadium after him in his honour.

Career statistics

International

International goals

References

External links
 

1981 births
2003 deaths
People from Musina Local Municipality
South African Venda people
South African soccer players
Association football forwards
Orlando Pirates F.C. players
Road incident deaths in South Africa
Dynamos F.C. (South Africa) players
Sportspeople from Limpopo
South Africa international soccer players